Lee Sang-wook (born October 14, 1985) is a South Korean male artistic gymnast and a member of the national team. He participated at the 2015 World Artistic Gymnastics Championships in Glasgow, and qualified for the 2016 Summer Olympics.

References

External links 
 

1985 births
Living people
South Korean male artistic gymnasts
People from Jeonju
Asian Games medalists in gymnastics
Gymnasts at the 2014 Asian Games
Gymnasts at the 2016 Summer Olympics
Olympic gymnasts of South Korea
Asian Games silver medalists for South Korea
Asian Games bronze medalists for South Korea
Medalists at the 2014 Asian Games
Sportspeople from North Jeolla Province
21st-century South Korean people